The 1982 FIFA World Cup final was a football match contested between Italy and West Germany. It was the final match of the 1982 FIFA World Cup tournament and was played on 11 July 1982 at the Santiago Bernabéu Stadium in the Spanish capital and largest city of Madrid.

Coming after their 1934 and 1938 victories, Italy had now drawn level with record champions Brazil. Italy's Paolo Rossi won the Golden Boot as the tournament's top goalscorer, and the Golden Ball as the tournament's best player (awarded for the first time). Italy's 40-year-old goalkeeper and captain Dino Zoff became the oldest player to win the World Cup.

Route to the final

Match

Summary
After a scoreless first half during which Antonio Cabrini fired a penalty low and wide to the right of goal, Paolo Rossi scored first, heading home a bouncing Claudio Gentile cross from the right from close range. Marco Tardelli then scored from the edge of the area with a low left footed shot before Alessandro Altobelli, at the end of a counterattack by winger Bruno Conti, made it 3–0 with another low left footed shot. Italy's lead appeared secure, encouraging Italian president Sandro Pertini to wag his finger at the cameras in a playful 'not going to catch us now' gesture from the stands. Paul Breitner scored for Germany in the 83rd minute, firing low past the goalkeeper from the right, but Italy held on to claim their first World Cup title in 44 years, and their third in total with a 3–1 victory.

Details

See also
Blocco-Juve
Germany–Italy football rivalry

References

External links
1982 FIFA World Cup Final planetworldcup.com
1982 FIFA World Cup Final shubhayan.com

1982 FIFA World Cup
FIFA World Cup finals
Italy national football team matches
1982C
Final
Final
Football in Madrid
1980s in Madrid
Italy–West Germany relations
Sports competitions in Madrid
July 1982 sports events in Europe